Business & Decision (frequently called B&D ) is an international consulting and systems integration company with its global headquarters in Paris, France.
The group specialises in Business Intelligence (BI), Customer Relationship Management (CRM), e-Business with two major directions : Data & Digital.

Business & Decision has a presence in 11 countries and employs more than 2400 people worldwide. It was listed on Euronext Paris as ticker symbol BND until 2020.

History 
 1992: founded by Patrick Bensabat in France
 2001: listed on Euronext Paris' nouveau marché . First international acquisitions in Belgium and UK
 2002-2006: expansion in 12 countries including first acquisition in the United States
 2012: 20th anniversary
 2014: acquisition of Ceri Medical & InFact
 2016: death of founder Patrick Bensabat
 2018: Orange Business Services acquires majority stake of the capital of Business & Decision

Activities
Business & Decision has worked for over 2100 clients globally. Some of its major activities include-

 Decision making and enterprise performance: Analytics, Business Intelligence, Performance Management and Big Data (65% of revenue);
 e-Business : Digital Business, Web Marketing, Search Engine Optimisation (SEO), on-line strategy, e-commerce, hosting and data warehouse (18% of revenue).
 Customer Relationship Management : CRM front office, marketing campaigns management, interactive marketing, analytical CRM (17% of revenue);
 Digital Transformation : Business consultancy approach and focus on innovative technologies; how synergies can be triggered within the organizations cross-departments. Hot topics are real time decision, customer DNA, fraud detection, e-beacon, omnichannel, lean process management...

Geographical locations 

 Belgium
 France
 Luxembourg
 Mauritius
 Morocco
 Netherlands
 Russia
 Spain
 Switzerland
 Tunisia
 United States
 Switzerland

Key figures

Quotation and shareholding 
 Company listed at Euronext Paris
 ISIN = FR0000078958 - BND
 Currency =  euro
 Shareholding :
 Founder & Family: 65%
 Float (Euronext C): 35%

References

 Le Journal du Net
 Investir

External links
 
 Official Website Belgium
 XPRON Systems GmbH

Consulting firms established in 1992
Information technology consulting firms of France
International information technology consulting firms
International management consulting firms
Companies formerly listed on the Paris Bourse